Pseudoechthistatus pufujiae is a species of beetle in the family Cerambycidae. It was described by Bi and Lin in 2016. It is known from China.

References

Phrissomini
Beetles described in 2016